Olof Patric Waldemar Sundström (born 14 December 1961) is a Swedish former professional ice hockey player. He played in the National Hockey League (NHL) for 10 seasons.

Playing career 
Sundström was drafted 175th overall by the Vancouver Canucks in the 1980 NHL Entry Draft.

One of the best players developed by IF Björklöven in Umeå, with whom he played for three full seasons, in 1982 he headed overseas to play in the NHL with the Vancouver Canucks.  Sundstrom played in Vancouver for five seasons before being traded to the New Jersey Devils on September 15, 1987 for Kirk McLean, Greg Adams and New Jersey's second round choice (Leif Rohlin) in the 1988 NHL Entry Draft, where he played another five seasons.

On April 22, 1988, Sundstrom set a Stanley Cup playoffs record (since tied by Mario Lemieux) by recording eight points (three goals and five assists) in New Jersey's 10-4 victory over the Washington Capitals in Game 3 of the Patrick Division Final. This broke the previous record of seven points, recorded on three occasions by Wayne Gretzky while with the Edmonton Oilers.

After leaving the NHL in 1992, he returned to Sweden to play the 1992-1993 season for Björklöven and was a contributing factor to them being promoted back to the Swedish Elite League (SEL) in 1993.

Sundstrom scored a total of 588 points (219 goals, 369 assists) in 679 regular season NHL games and 86 points (41 goals, 45 assists) in 115 games in the SEL.

Sundstrom represented Sweden at the 1980 and 1982 World Junior Ice Hockey Championships. He also represented Sweden in 31 official "caps" including the 1981, 1982 World Ice Hockey Championships, the 1981 and the 1984 Canada Cups.

At present, he works with youth ice hockey in Umeå.

He is the father of former New Jersey Devils prospect Alexander Sundström, and twin brother of Peter Sundström who also played in the NHL. His father, Elon Sundström, and uncle, Kjell Sundström, both played hockey at the highest Swedish level.

Career statistics

Regular season and playoffs

International

Awards 
 Bronze medal - 1980 World Junior Ice Hockey Championships
 Gold medal - 1981 World Junior Ice Hockey Championships
 Best forward at the 1981 World Junior Ice Hockey Championships
 Silver medal - 1981 Ice Hockey World Championships
 Golden Puck - 1981–82
 Silver medal - 1984 Canada Cup
 Viking Award - (best Swedish player of the NHL) 1983–84 and 1988–89

Records 
 NHL record for points in a playoff game (8), April 22, 1988  - (the record was tied by Mario Lemieux on April 25, 1989)
 Vancouver Canucks' franchise record for points in a regular season game on February 29, 1984 (7)
 Vancouver Canucks' franchise record for assists in a regular season game on February 29, 1984 (6)
 Vancouver Canucks' franchise record for goals in one season for a center during 1983–84 (38)

References

External links

1961 births
IF Björklöven players
Living people
New Jersey Devils players
People from Skellefteå Municipality
Swedish expatriate ice hockey players in Canada
Swedish expatriate ice hockey players in the United States
Swedish ice hockey centres
Swedish twins
Twin sportspeople
Utica Devils players
Vancouver Canucks draft picks
Vancouver Canucks players
Sportspeople from Västerbotten County